Cold Spring is a town in Jefferson County, Wisconsin, United States. The population was 727 in the recent 2010 census.

Geography

Demographics
As of the census of 2000, there were 766 people, 269 households, and 223 families residing in the town. The population density was 32.7 people per square mile (12.6/km2). There were 278 housing units at an average density of 11.9 per square mile (4.6/km2). The racial makeup of the town was 96.87% White, 0.26% African American, 0.26% Native American, 1.17% Asian, 1.04% from other races, and 0.39% from two or more races. Hispanic or Latino of any race were 2.61% of the population.

There were 269 households, out of which 34.9% had children under the age of 18 living with them, 74.0% were married couples living together, 5.9% had a female householder with no husband present, and 17.1% were non-families. 13.4% of all households were made up of individuals, and 5.2% had someone living alone who was 65 years of age or older. The average household size was 2.79 and the average family size was 3.03.

In the town, the population was spread out, with 25.1% under the age of 18, 6.0% from 18 to 24, 29.6% from 25 to 44, 29.4% from 45 to 64, and 9.9% who were 65 years of age or older. The median age was 39 years. For every 100 females, there were 108.2 males. For every 100 females age 18 and over, there were 111.0 males.

The median income for a household in the town was $60,789, and the median income for a family was $61,917. Males had a median income of $40,250 versus $26,016 for females. The per capita income for the town was $22,335. About 1.9% of families and 3.8% of the population were below the poverty line, including 1.6% of those under age 18 and 5.1% of those age 65 or over.

Notable people

 Nelson Fryer, farmer and politician, lived in Cold Spring; he served in the Wisconsin Assembly and as chairman of the town board
 George Wilbur Peck (1840–1916), author and governor of Wisconsin, moved to Cold Spring with his family in 1843; he left to enlist in the Union Army in 1863
 Jarvis K. Pike, state legislator and judge

References

Towns in Jefferson County, Wisconsin
Towns in Wisconsin